Shiva Kotta Sowbhagya is a 1985 Indian Kannada-language film, directed by Hunsur Krishnamurthy and produced by V. Vargheese. The film stars Lokesh, Aarathi, Jayanthi and Rajanand.

Cast
Lokesh
Aarathi
Jayanthi
Rajanand
B. K. Shankar
Dingri Nagaraj
Roopa Chakravarthy

Soundtrack
The music was composed by T. G. Lingappa.

References

External links
 

1985 films
1980s Kannada-language films
Films scored by T. G. Lingappa
Films directed by Hunsur Krishnamurthy